Ugljevik City Stadium is a football stadium located in Ugljevik, in Northeastern Bosnia and Herzegovina. It is the home ground of FK Zvijezda 09. The capacity of the stadium is 5,000 seats.

The stadium was bought for 803,000 marks in March 2017.

References

External links
Ugljevik City Stadium at Football-Lineups

Architecture in Bosnia and Herzegovina
Football venues in Bosnia and Herzegovina
Music venues in Bosnia and Herzegovina
Sports venues completed in 2000
2000 establishments in Bosnia and Herzegovina